The Southern Football League was a Scottish regional football competition held during World War II, due to the suspension of the Scottish Football League (an interim nationwide War Emergency League was played in the 1939–40 season). Held between 1940 and 1946, the competition was played as a single division until the introduction of teams in 1945–46 from the disbanded North Eastern League, forcing the addition of a second division. Rangers dominated the competition, winning every tournament. The league also ran two cup competitions: the Southern League Cup and the Summer Cup. As the war ended, regular league football returned in 1946, with the regional leagues disbanded.

Tournaments

References

 
Wartime football in Scotland
Defunct football leagues in Scotland
Recurring sporting events disestablished in 1946
Recurring sporting events established in 1940
1946 disestablishments in Scotland
1940 establishments in Scotland